Juchereau Duchesnay is a surname. Notable people with the surname include:

Antoine Juchereau Duchesnay (seigneur) (1740–1806), the Seigneur of Beauport, Saint-Denis, Fossambault, Gaudarville, and Saint-Roch-des-Aulnaies
Antoine-Louis Juchereau Duchesnay (1767–1825), seigneur, soldier and political figure in Lower Canada
Édouard-Louis-Antoine-Charles Juchereau Duchesnay (1809–1886), political figure in Canada East and a Conservative member of the Senate of Canada
Elzéar-Henri Juchereau Duchesnay (1809–1871), seigneur, lawyer and political figure in Canada East
Henri-Jules Juchereau Duchesnay (1845–1887), lawyer, farmer and political figure in Quebec
Michel-Louis Juchereau Duchesnay (1785–1838), Canadian officer, seigneur, and justice of the peace